Mistry or Mistry may refer to:
Mistri – a word used for master-craftsman or foreman in India, such as the vishwakarma caste.
Mistri (caste) – a caste of India.
Mistry (surname) – a surname used by persons of India or Indian origin.
Mistris of Kutch – another name for KGK Community of India.
Raj Mistry – a caste & word used for master craftsman in India.